Gabriel Teixeira Aragão (born 1 April 2001), known as Gabriel Teixeira or Biel, is a Brazilian footballer who plays as an attacking midfielder for Bahia.

Club career
Born in Pajuçara, Maracanaú, Ceará, Biel represented Brasília and Bahia before joining Fluminense's youth setup at the age of 12. On 24 December 2020, after loans at ŠTK Šamorín and Santo Ângelo, he renewed his contract until December 2023.

Biel made his first team debut for Flu on 4 March 2021, starting in a 1–2 Campeonato Carioca away loss against Resende. Seven days later, he further extended his deal until 2024.

Biel scored his first senior goal on 25 April 2021, netting his team's fourth in a 4–1 home success over Madureira.

Career statistics

Honours
Grêmio
Recopa Gaúcha: 2022

References

External links
Fluminense profile 

2001 births
Living people
People from Fortaleza
Sportspeople from Ceará
Brazilian footballers
Association football midfielders
Campeonato Brasileiro Série A players
Campeonato Brasileiro Série B players
Fluminense FC players
Grêmio Foot-Ball Porto Alegrense players
Esporte Clube Bahia players